Co-amilozide (BAN) is a non-proprietary combination of amiloride and hydrochlorothiazide. Co-amilozide is used in the treatment of hypertension and congestive heart failure with the tendency of the thiazide to cause low potassium levels (hypokalaemia) offset by the potassium-sparing effects of amiloride.

Formulation 
Two strengths of co-amilozide are currently available in the UK:
 2.5 mg amiloride and 25 mg hydrochlorothiazide, BAN of Co-amilozide 2.5/25 (brand name Moduret 25)
 5 mg amiloride and 50 mg hydrochlorothiazide, BAN of Co-amilozide 5/50 (brand name Moduretic)

In North America:
 Moduretic (U.S., Canada)
 Moduretic 5-50 (U.S., Canada) 
 Novamilor (Canada)

Side effects
The most common side effect is headache (about 8% of people taking it) and nausea, loss of appetite, weakness, rash and dizziness (each about 3%).

Common side effects (1/10 - 1/100) include:
General: weakness, fatigue, loss of appetite, headache, dizziness.
Circulatory system: arrhythmia.
Gastrointestinal: nausea, diarrhea, abdominal pain.
Skin: exanthema, itching.
Respiratory system: shortness of breath, cough.
Metabolic: elevated blood sugar in diabetic patients, elevated uric acid levels in the blood.
Musculoskeletal: pain in the limbs.

References

Potassium-sparing diuretics
Thiazides
Combination drugs